Lubomír Zaorálek (born 6 September 1956) is a Czech politician, who served as the Minister of Foreign Affairs under Prime Minister Bohuslav Sobotka from 2014 to 2017, and Minister of Culture under Prime Minister Andrej Babiš from 2019 to 2021. He was a Member of the Chamber of Deputies (MP) from 1996 to 2021, and unsuccessfully ran for the premiership in the 2017 election but his Social Democratic Party received only 7% of the vote.

Early life 
He was born on 6 September 1956 in Ostrava, and graduated from Jan Evangelista Purkyně University (today Masaryk University) in Brno in 1982. He worked as a dramaturge at Czechoslovak Television in Ostrava.

Political career 
During the Velvet Revolution in November 1989 he participated in Civic Forum.

Zaorálek was first elected to the Chamber of Deputies in 1996 as a member of the Czech Social Democratic Party (ČSSD), becoming the party's vice chairman in 2009. From 2002 to 2006, he was the Speaker of the Chamber of Deputies.

He served as Minister of Foreign Affairs from 2014 to 2017 in the Cabinet of Prime Minister Bohuslav Sobotka, and then as Minister of Culture in the Cabiner of Prime Minister Andrej Babis from 2019 to 2021. He lost his seat in the Chamber of Deputies when ČSSD failed to qualify to enter parliament at the 2021 general election.

External links

  Official Chamber of Deputies website
  Ministry of Foreign Affairs of the Czech Republic official profile

See also
List of foreign ministers in 2017
List of current foreign ministers

References

|-

1956 births
Living people
Politicians from Ostrava
Czech National Social Party politicians
Civic Forum politicians
Civic Movement politicians
Czech Social Democratic Party MPs
Foreign Ministers of the Czech Republic
Culture ministers of the Czech Republic
Members of the Chamber of the People of Czechoslovakia (1986–1990)
Speakers of the Chamber of Deputies (Czech Republic)
Members of the Chamber of Deputies of the Czech Republic (1996–1998)
Members of the Chamber of Deputies of the Czech Republic (1998–2002)
Members of the Chamber of Deputies of the Czech Republic (2002–2006)
Members of the Chamber of Deputies of the Czech Republic (2006–2010)
Members of the Chamber of Deputies of the Czech Republic (2010–2013)
Members of the Chamber of Deputies of the Czech Republic (2013–2017)
Members of the Chamber of Deputies of the Czech Republic (2017–2021)
Masaryk University alumni